Algarolutra is an extinct endemic genus of otter from the Pleistocene of Corsica and Sardinia. The single species A. majori was originally attributed to the genus Cyrnaonyx and its type species C. antiqua, which was based on fossils from Corsica and also from mainland France. From mainland Europe, only lower dentition was known, whereas from Corsica and Sardinia only upper dentition was known. When a Cyrnaonyx antiqua fossil with both upper and lower dentition was found in England, it became clear that the species majori was too different to keep even in the same genus and the genus Algarolutra was described. appearing to belong to separate genera. A. majori is known only from very sparse evidence.

Sources 

 Malatesta, A. & Willemsen, G. F. 'Algarolutra g.n. established for a fossil otter of the Sardinia island'. Geologica Romana 25: 285-286 (1986)
 Willemsen, G. F., 'A revision of the Pliocene and Quaternary Lutrinae from Europe', Scripta Geologica vol. 101 (1992).

Prehistoric mustelids
Pleistocene carnivorans
Prehistoric monotypic mammal genera
Prehistoric mammals of Europe
Fossil taxa described in 1978
Prehistoric carnivoran genera